Bernard Ronald James (born February 7, 1985) is an American former professional basketball player. He played college basketball for Florida State University. He is also the oldest player ever to be drafted in the National Basketball Association (NBA) at 27 years and 148 days old.

Background
In a 2012 piece for The Tipoff, the magazine of the United States Basketball Writers Association, ESPN.com writer Dana O'Neil called James...the most unconventional of high school dropouts, a kid who grew disenchanted with the social hierarchy of school yet would head to Barnes & Noble to read on the days that he cut.

After dropping out, he earned his GED, and shortly afterwards enlisted in the United States Air Force while still 17. He served six years in the Air Force as a security forces specialist, attaining the rank of Staff Sergeant. He was assigned to the 9th Security Forces Squadron at Beale Air Force Base and deployed in support of Operation Iraqi Freedom and Operation Enduring Freedom to Iraq, Qatar, and Afghanistan.

He initially planned to have a career in the military, but was drafted onto an intramural basketball team at his base. During this time, he underwent a late growth spurt of 5 inches (13 cm), and soon rose through the ranks of military basketball to the Air Force's all-star team. This in turn led him to pursue basketball as a potential career path; when his enlistment term expired, he left the Air Force and enrolled at Tallahassee Community College so that he could eventually fully qualify for NCAA Division I.

Professional career
James was selected as the 33rd overall pick by the Cleveland Cavaliers in the 2012 NBA draft. He was later traded to the Dallas Mavericks in a draft night trade that included the 24th overall pick Jared Cunningham and the 34th overall pick Jae Crowder. The Cavaliers received guard Kelenna Azubuike and the 17th overall pick Tyler Zeller.

On July 25, 2012, James signed with the Dallas Mavericks. On July 19, 2013, he was waived by the Mavericks, but he was quickly re-signed on July 26.

On February 27, 2014, James was assigned to the Texas Legends of the NBA D-League. He was recalled the next day.

On September 3, 2014, James re-signed with the Mavericks. However, he was later waived by the Mavericks on October 25, 2014. On November 3, 2014, he was acquired by the Texas Legends as an affiliate player. After playing in the Legends' first two games of the season, he left the team in order to sign in China. On November 21, 2014, he signed with the Shanghai Sharks for the 2014–15 CBA season.

On February 11, 2015, James signed a 10-day contract with the Dallas Mavericks, returning to the franchise for a second stint. He signed a second 10-day contract with the Mavericks on February 21, and for the rest of the season on March 3.

On July 31, 2015, James re-signed with the Shanghai Sharks for the 2015–16 CBA season. On March 12, 2016, he signed with Galatasaray of Turkey for the rest of the 2015–16 Turkish Basketball Super League season. In early May 2016, he left Galatasaray.

On January 6, 2017, James signed with French club Limoges CSP for the rest of the 2016–17 Pro A season. On February 7, 2017, he parted ways with Limoges after appearing in two games.

NBA career statistics

Regular season

|-
| align="left" | 
| align="left" | Dallas
| 46 || 11 || 9.9 || .515 || .000 || .610 || 2.8 || .1 || .3 || .8 || 2.8
|-
| align="left" | 
| align="left" | Dallas
| 30 || 0 || 4.9 || .478 || .000 || .545 || 1.4 || .1 || .1 || .3 || .9
|-
| align="left" | 
| align="left" | Dallas
| 16 || 2 || 9.9 || .444 || .000 || .870 || 2.4 || .3 || .1 || .9 || 2.8
|-
| align="left" | Career
| align="left" | 
| 92 || 13 || 8.3 || .497 || .000 || .680 || 2.3 || .1 || .2 || .7 || 2.2

Playoffs

|-
| style="text-align:left;"| 2014
| style="text-align:left;"| Dallas
| 2 || 0 || 4.0 || .000 || .000 || .000 || .5 || .0 || .5 || .0 || .0
|-
| style="text-align:left;"| 2015
| style="text-align:left;"| Dallas
| 1 || 0 || 2.0 || .000 || .000 || .000 || .0 || .0 || .0 || .0 || .0
|-
| style="text-align:left;"| Career
| style="text-align:left;"| 
| 3 || 0 || 3.3 || .000 || .000 || .000 || .3 || .0 || .3 || .0 || .0

References

External links
 
 
 FIBA.com profile

1985 births
Living people
African-American basketball players
American expatriate basketball people in China
American expatriate basketball people in France
American expatriate basketball people in Turkey
American men's basketball players
Basketball players from Savannah, Georgia
Centers (basketball)
Cleveland Cavaliers draft picks
Dallas Mavericks players
Florida State Seminoles men's basketball players
Galatasaray S.K. (men's basketball) players
Limoges CSP players
Shanghai Sharks players
Tallahassee Eagles men's basketball players
Texas Legends players
United States Air Force airmen
United States Air Force personnel of the Iraq War
United States Air Force personnel of the War in Afghanistan (2001–2021)
African-American United States Air Force personnel